Hasenhüttl is an Austrian surname. Notable people with the surname include:

Patrick Hasenhüttl (born 1997), Austrian footballer
Ralph Hasenhüttl (born 1967), Austrian football manager and former player

German-language surnames